"The Revelations of ’Becka Paulson" is a short horror story by American writer Stephen King. It was first published in the July 19 – August 2, 1984 issue of Rolling Stone magazine, and later collected into a limited edition of King's 1985 collection Skeleton Crew. The story was reworked and incorporated as a subplot in The Tommyknockers.

Plot summary 
'Becka Paulson accidentally shoots herself in the head while spring cleaning. The bullet lodges in her brain, and begins to have some strange effects. In a stroke of 'luck', the bullet does not kill 'Becka, but her severe brain damage causes her to begin to hallucinate that the picture of Jesus on top of the TV is talking to her. Over the following weeks, Jesus proceeds to tell her the deepest secrets of everyone she comes into contact with, including that her husband, Joe, is having an affair with Nancy Voss, who works at the local Post Office. Under the instruction of Jesus, 'Becka opens up the television and rewires it to fatally electrocute whoever touches the knob. After Joe's afternoon nap, he walks into the living room and goes to turn on the television, resulting in a gruesome scene where his body starts to burn to a crisp, turning black with his hair starting to smoke. As 'Becka watches Joe burst into flames, and the picture of Jesus explodes, she realizes that everything Jesus had told her was made up and all in her head, caused by the bullet she had shot herself with. 'Becka, with a sudden change of heart, jumps up to try to save Joe, electrocuting herself in the process, and the two fall dead, the victim of a tragic quirk of fate that was in the end far from lucky.

Adaptations 
The story was adapted into an episode of 1995 television series The Outer Limits. Brad Wright wrote the teleplay, and Steven Weber directed.

In July 2020, Deadline Hollywood announced that The CW is adapting the story into a one-hour drama series titled Revelations.

See also 

 Stephen King short fiction bibliography

References

External links 

 The Revelations of ’Becka Paulson title listing at the Internet Speculative Fiction Database

Short stories by Stephen King
1984 short stories
Horror short stories
Short stories adapted into films